Panevėžys County is one of ten counties in Lithuania. It is in the north-east of the country, and its capital is Panevėžys. On 1 July 2010, the county administration was abolished, and since that date, Panevėžys County remains as the territorial and statistical unit.

History 
Historical documents from the 16th century mention Panevėžys as an administrative region.

Municipalities 
Panevėžys County comprises the following municipalities:

Geography 
Panevėžys county is the fourth largest county in Lithuania:
202 km² cities and towns;
145 km² factories and roads;
4822 km² farmland;
2109 km² forests;
200 km² lakes and streams;
406 km² other.
Panevėžys County borders with Latvia, and also with Lithuanian counties of Utena, Vilnius, Kaunas and Šiauliai.

Tourism 
The region offers 9 hotels and 7 country inns for tourists and travellers. There are 8 tourist agencies and 3 tourist information centers catering to the public.

Industry 
Panevėžys County generates more than 3.4 billion Litas of GNP. Average annual household income is 10.6 thousand Litas (approx 2.6 thousand US dollars). The county is responsible for approximately 7% of the national industrial output. There are 105 factories and concerns employing 17 thousand workers. In the year 2000, factory output topped 1.76 billion Litas.

References

External links
Social and demographic characteristics of Panevėžys County
Economy of Panevėžys County
Environment of Panevėžys County

 
Counties of Lithuania